The following highways are numbered 457:

Brazil
 BR-457

Canada
Manitoba Provincial Road 457

Japan
 Japan National Route 457

United States
  Kentucky Route 457
  Maryland Route 457 (former)
  Puerto Rico Highway 457
  Tennessee State Route 457
  Farm to Market Road 457
  Virginia State Route 457